Tahiti Honey is a 1943 American musical comedy film directed by John H. Auer and starring Simone Simon, Dennis O'Keefe and Michael Whalen.

The film's sets were designed by the art director Russell Kimball.

Premise
A new female singer joins a band she meets in Tahiti, but radically changes their style of music.

Cast
 Simone Simon as Suzette 'Suzie' Durand
 Dennis O'Keefe as Mickey Monroe 
 Michael Whalen as Lt. John Barton
 Lionel Stander as Pinkie
 Wally Vernon as Maxie
 Tom Seidel as Wally
 Dan Seymour as Fats
 Edward Gargan as George, the Bartender
 Abigail Adams as Linda 
 Earl Audet as Sailor
 Mary Bertrand a sMother
 Edward Biby as Night Club Patron
 Harry Burns as Joe
 Eleanor Counts as Girl with Sailor
 Bess Flowers as Night Club Patron
 Geraldine Jordan as Cigarette Girl
 Eddie Kane as Manager of Miami Hotel
 Forbes Murray as Commander

References

Bibliography
  Len D. Martin. The Republic Pictures Checklist: Features, Serials, Cartoons, Short Subjects and Training Films of Republic Pictures Corporation, 1935-1959. McFarland, 1998.

External links
 

1943 films
1943 musical comedy films
1940s English-language films
American musical comedy films
Films directed by John H. Auer
Republic Pictures films
Films set in Tahiti
American black-and-white films
1940s American films